Glass palace can refer to:

 Glaspaleis, a building in Heerlen, the Netherlands
 Glass Palace Chronicle, the English translation of the standard chronicle of the Konbaung dynasty of Burma
 The Glass Palace, a 2000 historical novel by Indian writer Amitav Ghosh

See also 
 Crystal Palace (disambiguation)